Higinio Anglés or Higini Anglès i Pàmies(his complete name in Catalan), (Catalonia 1888 – Roma 1969) was a Spanish priest and musicologist.

Honours 
  : Grand Cross of the Order of Isabella the Catholic (06/01/1958)

1969 deaths
Spanish musicologists
1888 births
20th-century Spanish Roman Catholic priests
Knights Grand Cross of the Order of Isabella the Catholic
20th-century musicologists